Styphelia stricta  is a small plant in the family Ericaceae. It is endemic to  Western Australia.

The species was described in 1868 as Leucopogon strictus by George Bentham. In 1882, Ferdinand von Mueller transferred it to the genus, Styphelia, to give the name accepted by the Western Australian Herbarium, (because of the phylogenetic study by Darren Crayn and others). This name is not accepted by CHAH, nor yet by Plants of the World Online.

It is found in the IBRA regions of Jarrah Forest and the  Swan Coastal Plain.

Description
Bentham describes it:

References

External links

 Styphelia stricta occurrence data from the Australasian Virtual Herbarium

stricta
Ericales of Australia
Eudicots of Western Australia
Taxa named by George Bentham
Taxa described in 1868